Heitor Villa-Lobos's Étude No. 3, part of his Twelve Études for Guitar, was first published by Max Eschig, Paris, in 1953.

Structure
The piece, strongly influenced by the didactic works of earlier composers for the guitar, is in D major and is marked Allegro moderato.

Analysis
Étude No. 3 is an arpeggio study, like the two preceding études, but incorporating slurred notes (as in Étude No. 2) and barre chords.

References

Cited sources

Further reading
 Villa-Lobos, sua obra. 1989. Third edition. Rio de Janeiro: MinC-SPHAN/Pró-Memória, Museu Villa-Lobos. Online edition, 2009
 Wright, Simon. 1992. Villa-Lobos. Oxford Studies of Composers. Oxford and New York: Oxford University Press.  (cloth);  (pbk).

Compositions by Heitor Villa-Lobos
Guitar études
Compositions in D major